John Dittmer (born 1939) is an American historian, and Professor Emeritus of DePauw University.

Life
John Dittmer is from Seymour, IN. He graduated from Shields High School in Seymour in 1957, being inducted into SHS Wall of Fame in 2006. He later graduated from Indiana University with bachelor's, master's and doctoral degrees.

He taught American history at Tougaloo College from 1967 to 1979, at Massachusetts Institute of Technology, Brown University, and at DePauw University from 1985 until 2003.

Reviews of Other Books 
He reviewed The Confederate and New-Confederate Reader: The "Great Truth" about the "Lost Cause" (edited by James W. Loewen and Edward Sebesta). He called the book an "important" and "persuasive" book, and he argued that it should be "required reading for classroom teachers." He agreed with what the book had to say about "slavery, secession, the Civil War, and Reconstruction."

Awards
 1995 Bancroft Prize
 Lillian Smith Book Award

Works

References

External links
"The Good Doctors - by John Dittmer", YouTube
"Grass Roots Civil Rights", Virginia Quarterly Review, Robert J. Norrell, Autumn 1996

21st-century American historians
American male non-fiction writers
Bancroft Prize winners
Indiana University alumni
1939 births
MIT School of Humanities, Arts, and Social Sciences faculty
Brown University faculty
DePauw University faculty
Living people
21st-century American male writers
Historians of the civil rights movement